Frostbite Spine is a prominent ridge,  long, between Hooker Glacier and Salient Glacier on the east side of the Royal Society Range, Victoria Land, Antarctica. It was named by the New Zealand Antarctic Place-Names Committee from a proposal by R.H. Findlay, whose New Zealand Antarctic Research Program geological party worked in the area of the ridge in 1979–80. A party member suffered frostbite injury here and had to be replaced.

References

Ridges of Victoria Land
Scott Coast